According to the Pew Research Center in a 2014 survey, self-identified atheists make up 3.1% of the US population, even though 9% of Americans agreed with the statement "Do not believe in God" while 2% agreed with the statement "Do not know if they believe in God".

According to the 2014 General Sociological Survey, the number of atheists and agnostics in the U.S. grew over the previous 23 years. In 1991, only 2% identified as atheist, and 4% identified as agnostic; while in 2014, 3.1% identified as atheists, and 5% identified as agnostics. 

In 2009, Pew stated that only 5% of the US population did not have a belief in a god and out of that small group only 24% self-identified as "atheist", while 15% self-identified as "agnostic" and 35% self-identified as "nothing in particular".

According to the 2008 ARIS, only 2% the US population was atheist, while 10% were agnostics. 

One 2018 research paper using indirect methods estimated that 26% of Americans are atheists, which is much higher than the 3%-11% rates that are consistently found in surveys. However, methodological problems have been identified with this particular study; in particular, it has been posted that many people might not have a binary outlook to the question of the existence of God.

Accurate demographics of atheism are difficult to obtain since conceptions of atheism and self-identification are context dependent by culture.

Demographics

Age

Education

Gender

Generation

Household income

Immigrant status

Marital status

Metro area

Political affiliation

Parental status

Political ideology

Race

Region

Religion

Sexual orientation

State/federal district

Public officials

United States Representatives

United States Senators

Governors

State legislators

Mayors

City councils

Political views

Views of atheists 
A June–September 2014 Pew Research Center survey found that 69% of atheist Americans identity as Democratic or lean Democratic, 17% have no lean, 15% identify as Republican, 56% liberal, 29% moderate, 10% conservative, and 5% don't know. Among Americans who don't believe in god/gods, 65% identity as Democratic or lean Democratic, 17% have no lean, 18% identity as Republican, 50% liberal, 31% moderate, 13% conservative, and 6% don't know. That makes atheist and nonbelievers in god/gods Americans as belief groups to be the most politically liberal belief group in America and the least politically aligned belief group with Republicans and conservatism in the United States.

Views about atheists 
In 2014, a Pew survey found that 53% of Americans claimed they would be less likely to vote for a presidential candidate who was an atheist.

Groups that include atheists 
A October 2013 Public Religion Research Institute American Values Survey found 58% of American libertarians report they believe in a personal god, 25% believe god is an impersonal force in the universe, and 16% report that they do not believe in a god. It also found 73% of Americans who identify with the Tea Party report they believe in a personal god, 19% believe god is an impersonal force in the universe, and 6% report that they do not believe in a god. It also found 90% of white evangelical Protestants report they believe in a personal god, 8% believe god is an impersonal force in the universe, and less than 1% report that they do not believe in a god.

List of atheist Americans

Organizations
American Atheists
Atheist Alliance International
Freedom From Religion Foundation
Freethinking Atheist and Agnostic Kinship
International League of non-religious and atheists
Internet Infidels
Military Association of Atheists & Freethinkers
Rational Response Squad
Recovering from Religion
The Clergy Project

See also
 Atheism
 Discrimination against atheists in the United States
 Irreligion in the United States
 Religion in the United States

References

Further reading
 Casey Cep, "Without a Prayer:  Why are Americans still uncomfortable with atheism?", The New Yorker, October 29, 2018, pp. 66–71.  Discusses R. Laurence Moore and Isaac Kramnick, Godless Citizens in a Godly Republic:  Atheists in American Public Life, Norton, 2018; and John Gray, Seven Types of Atheism, Farrar, Straus & Giroux, 2018, which defines "atheist" as "anyone with no use for a divine mind that has fashioned the world" (a category that includes nontheist religions with no creator god, such as Buddhism and Taoism).
 Schmidt, Leigh Eric, Village Atheists: How America's Unbelievers Made Their Way in a Godly Nation, Princeton, NJ, Princeton University Press, 2016.
 Michael Shermer, "Silent No More: The rise of the atheists", Scientific American, vol. 318, no. 4 (April 2018), p. 77. Studies suggest that some 26 percent of Americans – more than 64 million people – are atheists. "[W]e should continue working on grounding our morals and values on viable secular sources such as reason and science."

External links
 Reality Check: Being Nonreligious in America 2020 report from American Atheists

 
Religion in the United States
Religious demographics
Atheism